Ken Morgan (28 July 1932 – 20 December 2008) was a Welsh professional footballer who made one appearance in the Football League for Crystal Palace as an outside right.

References 

1932 births
2008 deaths
Footballers from Swansea
Association football outside forwards
Welsh footballers
Fulham F.C. players
Northampton Town F.C. players
English Football League players
Watford F.C. players
Brentford F.C. players
Crystal Palace F.C. players
Guildford City F.C. players
Southern Football League players